Daniel di Tomasso (born 30 January 1983) is a Canadian actor. In 2013, he began starring as a series regular in the television drama series Witches of East End, as Killian Gardiner. Di Tomasso also appeared on Beauty and the Beast, Grimm, CSI: Crime Scene Investigation, Timeless and the Amazon original series Good Girls Revolt. From 2016 through 2018, he joined the series Major Crimes as Detective Wes Nolan. In 2018 he appeared on Chicago Fire series. In 2019 and 2020, he appeared as Fletcher Myers in The CW reboot series Dynasty, and the Netflix show Ratched. He has also been cast in the upcoming shows The Republic of Sarah and Y: The Last Man, and in French Exit.

Before acting, he had a successful career as an international male model, shooting campaigns for a range of clients, including Armani collezioni and Giorgio Armani face cream, Vichy face cream, L’Oréal, Azzaro perfume and many more.

Di Tomasso was born and raised in Montreal. He speaks English, French and Italian.

Filmography

External links

References

1983 births
Living people
Canadian male models
Canadian male television actors
Male actors from Montreal
21st-century Canadian male actors
Canadian people of Italian descent